Ayọ̀bámi Adébáyọ̀ (born 29 January 1988) is a Nigerian writer. Her 2017 debut novel, Stay With Me, won the 9mobile Prize for Literature and the Prix Les Afriques. She was awarded The Future Awards Africa Prize for Arts and Culture in 2017.

Early years 
Ayọ̀bámi Adébáyọ̀ was born in Lagos, Nigeria, in 1988; shortly after, her family moved to Ilesa and then to Ile-Ife, where she spent most of her childhood in the University Staff Quarters of Obafemi Awolowo University.

Writing career 
Adébáyọ̀ studied at Obafemi Awolowo University, earning BA and MA degrees in Literature in English. She went to study Creative Writing (MA Prose fiction) at the University of East Anglia, where she was awarded an International Bursary. She has also studied writing with Chimamanda Ngozi Adichie and Margaret Atwood.

In 2015, Adébáyọ̀ was listed by the Financial Times as one of the bright stars of Nigerian literature.

Her debut novel, Stay With Me, was published in 2017 by Canongate Books to critical acclaim. Michiko Kakutani in her review of Stay With Me for The New York Times described Adébáyọ̀ as "an exceptional storyteller", adding: "She writes not just with extraordinary grace but with genuine wisdom about love and loss and the possibility of redemption. She has written a powerfully magnetic and heartbreaking book." The book was subsequently published in the US by Alfred A. Knopf and in Nigeria by Ouida Books. It has been translated into more than 18 languages. It was selected as notable book of the year by several publications, including The New York Times, The Economist, The Wall Street Journal and The Guardian.

Stay with Me was shortlisted for the Wellcome Book Prize, the Baileys Women's Prize for Fiction, as well as for the 9mobile Prize for Literature (formerly the Etisalat Prize for Literature), which the novel won in 2019. It was also longlisted for the International Dublin Literary Award and the Dylan Thomas Prize.

Prior to publication, the novel had been shortlisted for the Kwani? Manuscript Project, a prize for unpublished fiction. The series editor is Ellah Wakatama Allfrey.

In 2020, Reste Avec Moi, the French translation of Stay with Me, was awarded the Prix Les Afriques. The translation by Josette Chicheportiche was published in 2019 by Charleston Editions.

Adébáyọ̀ has been a writer in residence at Ledig House Omi, Hedgebrook, Sinthian Cultural Institute, Ox-Bow School of Art, MacDowell Colony and Ebedi Hills.  She was shortlisted for the Miles Morland Scholarship in 2014 and 2015.

In 2021, Adébáyọ̀'s second novel, A Spell of Good Things – described as being "about family secrets and bonds, thwarted hope, and the brutal realities of life in a society rife with inequality" – was announced for publication by Canongate (UK) and Knopf (US).

Personal life 
Adébáyọ̀ is married to Emmanuel Iduma.

Bibliography

Books 
 Stay with Me. Knopf, 2017, US. Canongate Books, 2017, UK.
 A Spell of Good Things, Canongate, forthcoming in 2023.

Other writing 
One of Adébáyọ̀'s stories was highly commended in the 2009 Commonwealth Short Story Competition. Her poems and stories have been published in several magazines and anthologies, including  East Jasmine Review, Farafina Magazine, Saraba Magazine, Kalahari Review, Lawino Magazine, Speaking for the Generations: An Anthology of New African Writing, Off the Coast: Maine’s International Journal of Poetry, Ilanot Review, Gambit: Newer African Writing, and New Daughters of Africa: An international anthology of writing by women of African descent (edited by Margaret Busby). Adébáyọ̀ has also written non-fiction pieces for Elle UK and the BBC.

Awards
 2017: Shortlisted for the Baileys Women's Prize for Fiction.
2017: WINNER The Future Awards Africa (Arts and Culture).
2018: Shortlisted for the Wellcome Book Prize.
2019: WINNER 9mobile Prize for Literature for Stay With Me.
2020: WINNER Prix Les Afriques for Stay With Me.

References

External links

 Official website
 Noor Brara, "Love Story: “Stay With Me,” the Debut Novel From Ayobami Adebayo, Explores New Horizons of Feminism and Relationships", Vogue, 9 August 2017.
 Alice O'Keeffe, "Ayòbámi Adébáyò: ‘We should decide for ourselves what happiness looks like’", The Guardian, 26 February 2017.
 Interview , The Kwani? Manuscript Project, 2013.
 "Ayobami Adebayo Q&A: 'In 3018, I would love to be a therapist for robots, New Statesman, 25 November 2018.

1988 births
Living people
21st-century Nigerian novelists
21st-century Nigerian women writers
Alumni of the University of East Anglia
Nigerian expatriates in the United Kingdom
Nigerian women novelists
Obafemi Awolowo University alumni
Writers from Lagos